Anthony James Hawkins (March 31, 1958 – October 7, 2015) was a former American football linebacker in the National Football League. He was drafted by the Tampa Bay Buccaneers in the 10th round of the 1987 NFL Draft. He played college football at Texas A&M-Kingsville. Hawkins had 5.3 career sacks, and is the one of only three players (the others were the other two players involved in the sack) in the history of the National Football League to accomplish this. His one third of a sack came in 1982 while Hawkins was on the Buccaneers. On November 29, 1982, in a 23–17 win against the Miami Dolphins, Hawkins was one of two other players to sack quarterback Don Strock, and it was subsequently decided to award each of the three players involved in the sack one third of a sack.

Hawkins brother Mike also played in the NFL for the New England Patriots.

Andy died on October 7, 2015, at St. Luke's Episcopal Hospital, in Houston, Texas.

References

External links
Tampa Bay Buccaneers bio
Houston Gamblers bio

1958 births
2015 deaths
People from Bay City, Texas
Players of American football from Texas
American football linebackers
Texas A&M–Kingsville Javelinas football players
Tampa Bay Buccaneers players
Houston Gamblers players
San Diego Chargers players
Kansas City Chiefs players